Miriam Melanie Bryant (born 8 March 1991) is a Finnish-Swedish singer and songwriter.

Biography
Influenced by her British father's musical heritage and her Finnish mother's melancholy, Miriam Bryant began to write songs in November 2011 together with her childhood friend, Victor Rådström who is a producer and songwriter. Four months later, she produced three songs released in her single debut "Finders, Keepers" in March 2012 through the record label 100 songs. The song received worldwide attention among bloggers and music sites. She is signed to Warner Music in Sweden and to Interscope Records in the United States.

She has collaborated with music producer and DJ Zedd, who first heard her on the German radio. Zedd made a remix of her song "Push Play" on his re-released album.

Bryant released her Push Play EP on 8 October 2013 through Interscope Records, her debut release in the United States. In 2015, Bryant was one of eight artists being involved in the programme Så mycket bättre on the Swedish commercial channel TV4.

The single "Black Car" became a hit in homeland Sweden, winning Song of the Year in 2016. In 2017, Bryant was nominated for Best Live Act on the Swedish Grammis. In 2018, British press wrote the following about her single—Clash magazine wrote "Highly Intelligent and completely infectious", and The Line of Best Fit wrote "Miriam Bryant is your next pop superhero". In 2018, she has played at Roskilde Festival and The Great Escape Festival, to name a few.

In December 2019, she hosted the TV and radio fundraising project Musikhjälpen in Västerås together with Daniel Hallberg and Farah Abadi.

Discography

Studio albums

Extended plays

Singles

Featured songs

Other charted songs

Notes

References

External links

Official website

1991 births
Musicians from Gothenburg
Living people
English-language singers from Sweden
Swedish-language singers
Swedish singer-songwriters
Swedish people of British descent
Swedish people of Finnish descent
21st-century Swedish singers
21st-century Swedish women singers